"Culpa al Corazón" (English: "Blame the Heart") is a 2015 song by American singer Prince Royce. The song was released on November 13, 2015 as the lead single taken from Royce's fifth studio album, Five (2017). It received a Lo Nuestro nomination for Tropical Song of the Year.

The music video premiered on January 22, 2016 with Shadowhunters' co-star Emeraude Toubia (Royce's then-girlfriend, now ex-wife) playing the female lead role.

Charts

Weekly charts

Year-end charts

Certifications

See also
List of Billboard number-one Latin songs of 2016

References

2015 singles
2015 songs
Prince Royce songs
Sony Music Latin singles
Songs written by Prince Royce
Spanish-language songs
Songs written by Daniel Santacruz
Music videos directed by Jessy Terrero